Jim Boyle (1935–2015) was a Scottish international lawn and indoor bowls player.

Boyle won a silver medal in the triples and a bronze medal in the fours at the 1984 World Outdoor Bowls Championship in Aberdeen.

He made his Scottish international debut indoors in 1971 and outdoors in 1972.

References

Scottish male bowls players
1935 births
2015 deaths